Sherbrooke Airport  is a registered aerodrome located  east northeast of Sherbrooke, in the municipality of Cookshire-Eaton, Quebec, Canada.

The airport is classified as an airport of entry by Nav Canada and is staffed by the Canada Border Services Agency (CBSA). CBSA officers at this airport can handle aircraft with up to 30 passengers.

History

Weekday flights connecting Toronto were discontinued in 2009.

Airlines and destinations
There are no scheduled commercial services as of July 2017. However, occasional charter flights land at Sherbrooke airport, notably from Jazz or Nolinor.

Navigation aids

References

External links

Transport in Sherbrooke
Buildings and structures in Sherbrooke
Registered aerodromes in Estrie